The Tsotso or Abatsotso are a tribe of the Luhya nation in Kenya. They occupy three locations in Lurambi division of Kakamega District. The three locations are Bukura, north Butsotso and south Butsotso.

See also 
 Luhya people
 Luhya languages

References 

1. http://www.reliefweb.int/rw/fullMaps_Af.nsf/luFullMap/14A6905F99640EF98525766A0065CCB6/$File/map.pdf?OpenElement

Luhya